Timothy Armitage may refer to:
 Timothy Armitage (minister) (died 1655), English clergyman
 Timothy Armitage (politician) (1675–1715), Irish politician